The Polynesian Rugby Federation ( FPR) also known as Polynesian Rugby Federation-Tahiti is the governing body for rugby union in Tahiti. It is responsible for the Tahitian national team and the Fédération Polynésienne de Rugby-Tahiti that administers the country's professional leagues.

History
Due to Many Tahitians involved in the sport not recognizing the president of the FTR, the Polynesian Rugby Federation was formed in 2015. In 2018, FTR who is affiliated with World Rugby had to pull out of the Pacific Mini Games(Pacific Games) sevens rugby tournament due to not having the government of French Polynesia's support. This is because the government instead supports FPR.

Presidents
 Apolosi Foliaki (2016-2019)
 Laurent Tardieu (2019–2020)

See also
 Tahiti national rugby union team
 Fédération Polynésienne de Rugby-Tahiti

References

External links
 Official site

Rugby union governing bodies in Oceania
Sports organizations established in 2015
Rugby union in Tahiti